

24001–24100 

|-id=005
| 24005 Eddieozawa ||  || Eddie Ozawa, American mentor of a 2007 Discovery Channel Young Scientist Challenge (DCYSC) finalist || 
|-id=010
| 24010 Stovall ||  || Laraine Stovall, American mentor of a 2007 Discovery Channel Young Scientist Challenge (DCYSC) finalist || 
|-id=015
| 24015 Pascalepinner ||  || Pascale Pinner, American mentor of a 2007 Discovery Channel Young Scientist Challenge (DCYSC) finalist || 
|-id=019
| 24019 Jeremygasper ||  || Jeremy Gasper, American mentor of a 2007 Discovery Channel Young Scientist Challenge (DCYSC) finalist || 
|-id=021
| 24021 Yocum ||  || Ivan Yocum, American mentor of a 2007 Discovery Channel Young Scientist Challenge (DCYSC) finalist || 
|-id=024
| 24024 Lynnejohnson ||  || Lynne Johnson, American mentor of a 2007 Discovery Channel Young Scientist Challenge (DCYSC) finalist || 
|-id=025
| 24025 Kimwallin ||  || Kim Wallin, American mentor of a 2007 Discovery Channel Young Scientist Challenge (DCYSC) finalist || 
|-id=026
| 24026 Pusateri ||  || Lynne Pusateri, American mentor of a 2007 Discovery Channel Young Scientist Challenge (DCYSC) finalist || 
|-id=027
| 24027 Downs ||  || Karen Downs, American mentor of a 2007 Discovery Channel Young Scientist Challenge (DCYSC) finalist || 
|-id=028
| 24028 Veronicaduys ||  || Veronica Duys, American mentor of a 2007 Discovery Channel Young Scientist Challenge (DCYSC) finalist || 
|-id=032
| 24032 Aimeemcarthy ||  || Aimee McCarthy, American mentor of a 2007 Discovery Channel Young Scientist Challenge (DCYSC) finalist || 
|-id=044
| 24044 Caballo ||  || Cindy Caballo, American mentor of a 2007 Discovery Channel Young Scientist Challenge (DCYSC) finalist || 
|-id=045
| 24045 Unruh ||  || Amy Unruh, American mentor of a 2007 Discovery Channel Young Scientist Challenge (DCYSC) finalist || 
|-id=046
| 24046 Malovany ||  || Joseph Malovany, American tenor soloist, cantor of New York's Fifth Avenue Synagogue, and professor of Liturgical Music at Yeshiva University || 
|-id=048
| 24048 Pedroduque ||  || Pedro Duque, Spanish astronaut || 
|-id=051
| 24051 Hadinger ||  || Melisa Hadinger, American mentor of a 2007 Discovery Channel Young Scientist Challenge (DCYSC) finalist || 
|-id=052
| 24052 Nguyen ||  || Thuy-Anh Nguyen, American mentor of a 2007 Discovery Channel Young Scientist Challenge (DCYSC) finalist || 
|-id=053
| 24053 Shinichiro ||  || Shin-ichiro Okumura (born 1965), an astronomer at the Bisei Spacegaurd Center of Japan. || 
|-id=059
| 24059 Halverson ||  || Carl Halverson, American mentor of a 2007 Discovery Channel Young Scientist Challenge (DCYSC) finalist || 
|-id=060
| 24060 Schimenti ||  || Jamie Schimenti, American mentor of a 2007 Discovery Channel Young Scientist Challenge (DCYSC) finalist || 
|-id=062
| 24062 Hardister ||  || Scott Hardister, American mentor of a 2007 Discovery Channel Young Scientist Challenge (DCYSC) finalist || 
|-id=063
| 24063 Nanwoodward ||  || Nancy Woodward, American mentor of a 2007 Discovery Channel Young Scientist Challenge (DCYSC) finalist || 
|-id=065
| 24065 Barbfriedman ||  || Barbara Friedman, American mentor of a 2007 Discovery Channel Young Scientist Challenge (DCYSC) finalist || 
|-id=066
| 24066 Eriksorensen ||  || Erik Sorensen, American mentor of a 2007 Discovery Channel Young Scientist Challenge (DCYSC) finalist || 
|-id=068
| 24068 Simonsen ||  || Larry Simonsen Jr., American mentor of a 2007 Discovery Channel Young Scientist Challenge (DCYSC) finalist || 
|-id=069
| 24069 Barbarapener ||  || Barbara Pener, American mentor of a 2007 Discovery Channel Young Scientist Challenge (DCYSC) finalist || 
|-id=070
| 24070 Toniwest ||  || Toni West, American mentor of a 2007 Discovery Channel Young Scientist Challenge (DCYSC) finalist || 
|-id=074
| 24074 Thomasjohnson ||  || Thomas Johnson, American mentor of a 2007 Discovery Channel Young Scientist Challenge (DCYSC) finalist || 
|-id=084
| 24084 Teresaswiger ||  || Teresa Swiger, American mentor of a 2007 Discovery Channel Young Scientist Challenge (DCYSC) finalist || 
|-id=087
| 24087 Ciambetti ||  || Since 2005 Roberto Ciambetti (born 1946) has been promoting a new law against light pollution in the Veneto region. This law was renewed during the International Year of Astronomy, and astronomical observatories will now be more protected || 
|-id=093
| 24093 Tomoyamaguchi ||  || Tomohiro Yamaguchi (born 1984) is a trajectory analyst who has assisted in the construction of a cluster system for asteroid orbit computation in Sagamihara city. He studies orbital dynamics for both natural bodies and for interplanetary spacecraft such as Hayabusa and IKAROS. || 
|}

24101–24200 

|-
| 24101 Cassini ||  || Giovanni Domenico Cassini (a.k.a. Jean-Dominique Cassini), 17th-century Italian-born French astronomer || 
|-id=102
| 24102 Jacquescassini ||  || Jacques Cassini, French astronomer, son of Jean-Dominique Cassini || 
|-id=103
| 24103 Dethury ||  || César-François Cassini de Thury, French astronomer and cartographer, son of Jacques Cassini || 
|-id=104
| 24104 Vinissac ||  || Reversed spelling of "Cassini IV", i.e. Jean-Dominique Cassini, son of César-François || 
|-id=105
| 24105 Broughton ||  || John Broughton, Australian amateur astronomer || 
|-id=118
| 24118 Babazadeh ||  || Evan Joseph Babazadeh, American finalist in the 2008 Intel Science Talent Search (ISTS) ‡ || 
|-id=119
| 24119 Katherinrose ||  || Katherine Rose Banks, American finalist in the 2008 Intel Science Talent Search (ISTS) ‡ || 
|-id=120
| 24120 Jeremyblum ||  || Jeremy Evan Blum, American finalist in the 2008 Intel Science Talent Search (ISTS) ‡ || 
|-id=121
| 24121 Achandran ||  || Ashok Chandran, American finalist in the 2008 Intel Science Talent Search (ISTS)‡ ||  
|-id=123
| 24123 Timothychang ||  || Timothy Zuchi Chang, American finalist in the 2008 Intel Science Talent Search (ISTS) ‡ || 
|-id=124
| 24124 Dozier ||  || Benjamin Edward Dozier, American finalist in the 2008 Intel Science Talent Search (ISTS) ‡ || 
|-id=125
| 24125 Sapphozoe ||  || Sappho Zoe Gilbert, American finalist in the 2008 Intel Science Talent Search (ISTS) ‡ || 
|-id=126
| 24126 Gudjonson ||  || Herman Gudjonson, American finalist in the 2008 Intel Science Talent Search (ISTS) ‡ || 
|-id=128
| 24128 Hipsman ||  || Nathaniel Edward Hipsman, American finalist in the 2008 Intel Science Talent Search (ISTS) ‡ || 
|-id=129
| 24129 Oliviahu ||  || Olivia Hu, American finalist in the 2008 Intel Science Talent Search (ISTS) ‡ || 
|-id=130
| 24130 Alexhuang ||  || Alexander Chi-Jan Huang, American finalist in the 2008 Intel Science Talent Search (ISTS) ‡ || 
|-id=131
| 24131 Jonathuggins ||  || Jonathan Hunter Huggins, American finalist in the 2008 Intel Science Talent Search (ISTS) ‡ || 
|-id=133
| 24133 Chunkaikao ||  || Chun-Kai Kao, American finalist in the 2008 Intel Science Talent Search (ISTS) ‡ || 
|-id=134
| 24134 Cliffordkim ||  || Clifford Byungho Kim, American finalist in the 2008 Intel Science Talent Search (ISTS) ‡ || 
|-id=135
| 24135 Lisann ||  || Lauren Rose Lisann, American finalist in the 2008 Intel Science Talent Search (ISTS) ‡ || 
|-id=138
| 24138 Benjaminlu ||  || Benjamin Brice Lu, American finalist in the 2008 Intel Science Talent Search (ISTS) ‡ || 
|-id=139
| 24139 Brianmcarthy ||  || Brian Davis McCarthy, American finalist in the 2008 Intel Science Talent Search (ISTS) ‡ || 
|-id=140
| 24140 Evanmirts ||  || Evan Neal Mirts, American finalist in the 2008 Intel Science Talent Search (ISTS) ‡ || 
|-id=144
| 24144 Philipmocz ||  || Philip Mocz, American finalist in the 2008 Intel Science Talent Search (ISTS) ‡ || 
|-id=146
| 24146 Benjamueller ||  || Benjamin Julius Mueller, American finalist in the 2008 Intel Science Talent Search (ISTS) ‡ || 
|-id=147
| 24147 Stefanmuller ||  || Stefan Klein Muller, American finalist in the 2008 Intel Science Talent Search (ISTS) ‡ || 
|-id=148
| 24148 Mychajliw ||  || Alexis Marie Mychajliw, American finalist in the 2008 Intel Science Talent Search (ISTS) ‡ || 
|-id=149
| 24149 Raghavan ||  || Avanthi Raghavan, American finalist in the 2008 Intel Science Talent Search (ISTS) ‡ || 
|-id=152
| 24152 Ramasesh ||  || Vinay Venkatesh Ramasesh, American finalist in the 2008 Intel Science Talent Search (ISTS) ‡ || 
|-id=153
| 24153 Davidalex ||  || David Alex Rosengarten, American finalist in the 2008 Intel Science Talent Search (ISTS) ‡ || 
|-id=154
| 24154 Ayonsen ||  || Ayon Sen, American finalist in the 2008 Intel Science Talent Search (ISTS)  ‡ || 
|-id=155
| 24155 Serganov ||  || Artem Serganov, American finalist in the 2008 Intel Science Talent Search (ISTS) ‡ || 
|-id=156
| 24156 Hamsasridhar ||  || Hamsa Sridhar, American finalist in the 2008 Intel Science Talent Search (ISTS) ‡ || 
|-id=157
| 24157 Toshiyanagisawa ||  || Toshifumi Yanagisawa (born 1971), a senior researcher at JAXA. || 
|-id=158
| 24158 Kokubo ||  || Kokubo Eiichiro (born 1968), an astronomer at the National Astronomical Observatory of Japan. || 
|-id=159
| 24159 Shigetakahashi ||  || Shigeru Takahashi (born 1970), a Japanese solar system researcher. || 
|-id=162
| 24162 Askaci || 1999 WD || Astronomical Society of Kansas City || 
|-id=168
| 24168 Hexlein ||  || German for "little witch", the childhood nickname of Renate Kühnen, friend of Rainer Hesken, co-discoverer † || 
|-id=173
| 24173 SLAS ||  || Saint Louis Astronomical Society || 
|-id=186
| 24186 Shivanisud ||  || Shivani Sud, American finalist in the 2008 Intel Science Talent Search (ISTS) ‡ || 
|-id=188
| 24188 Matthewage ||  || Matthew Michael Wage, American finalist in the 2008 Intel Science Talent Search (ISTS) ‡ || 
|-id=189
| 24189 Lewasserman ||  || Louis Eric Wasserman, American finalist in the 2008 Intel Science Talent Search (ISTS) ‡ || 
|-id=190
| 24190 Xiaoyunyin ||  || Xiaoyun Yin, American finalist in the 2008 Intel Science Talent Search (ISTS) ‡ || 
|-id=191
| 24191 Qiaochuyuan ||  || Qiaochu Yuan, American finalist in the 2008 Intel Science Talent Search (ISTS) ‡ || 
|-id=194
| 24194 Paľuš ||  || Pavel Paľuš (born 1936), Slovak astronomer, one of the founders of the Modra Observatory. He has researched solar prominence and lectured at Comenius University in Bratislava (IAU). || 
|-id=198
| 24198 Xiaomengzeng ||  || Xiaomeng Zeng, American finalist in the 2008 Intel Science Talent Search (ISTS) ‡ || 
|-id=199
| 24199 Tsarevsky ||  || Irena Tsarevsky, American mentor of a 2008 Intel Science Talent Search (ISTS) finalist ‡ || 
|-id=200
| 24200 Peterbrooks ||  || Peter Brooks, American mentor of a 2008 Intel Science Talent Search (ISTS) finalist ‡ || 
|}

24201–24300 

|-
| 24201 Davidkeith ||  || David Keith, American mentor of a 2008 Intel Science Talent Search (ISTS) finalist ‡ || 
|-id=204
| 24204 Trinkle ||  || Maria Trinkle, American mentor of a 2008 Intel Science Talent Search (ISTS) finalist ‡ || 
|-id=206
| 24206 Mariealoia ||  || Marie Aloia, American mentor of a 2008 Intel Science Talent Search (ISTS) finalist ‡ || 
|-id=208
| 24208 Stelguerrero ||  || Stella Guerrero, American mentor of a 2008 Intel Science Talent Search (ISTS) finalist ‡ || 
|-id=210
| 24210 Handsberry ||  || Joy Handsberry, American mentor of a 2008 Intel Science Talent Search (ISTS) finalist ‡ || 
|-id=211
| 24211 Barbarawood ||  || Barbara Wood, American mentor of a 2008 Intel Science Talent Search (ISTS) finalist ‡ || 
|-id=214
| 24214 Jonchristo ||  || Jon Christopher, American mentor of a 2008 Intel Science Talent Search (ISTS) finalist ‡ || 
|-id=215
| 24215 Jongastel ||  || Jonathan Gastel, American mentor of a 2008 Intel Science Talent Search (ISTS) finalist ‡ || 
|-id=217
| 24217 Paulroeder ||  || Paul Roeder, American mentor of a 2008 Intel Science Talent Search (ISTS) finalist ‡ || 
|-id=218
| 24218 Linfrederick ||  || Linda Frederick, American mentor of a 2008 Intel Science Talent Search (ISTS) finalist ‡ || 
|-id=219
| 24219 Chrisodom ||  || Christopher Odom, American mentor of a 2008 Intel Science Talent Search (ISTS) finalist ‡ || 
|-id=224
| 24224 Matthewdavis ||  || Matthew Davis, American mentor of a 2008 Intel Science Talent Search (ISTS) finalist ‡ || 
|-id=226
| 24226 Sekhsaria ||  || Anupama Sekhsaria, American mentor of a 2008 Intel Science Talent Search (ISTS) finalist ‡ || 
|-id=232
| 24232 Lanthrum ||  || Drew Lanthrum, American mentor of a 2008 Intel Science Talent Search (ISTS) finalist ‡ || 
|-id=236
| 24236 Danielberger ||  || Daniel Berger, American mentor of a 2008 Intel Science Talent Search (ISTS) finalist ‡ || 
|-id=238
| 24238 Adkerson ||  || Timothy Adkerson, American mentor of a 2008 Intel Science Talent Search (ISTS) finalist ‡ || 
|-id=239
| 24239 Paulinehiga ||  || Pauline Higa, American mentor of a 2008 Intel Science Talent Search (ISTS) finalist ‡ || 
|-id=240
| 24240 Tinagal ||  || Tina Gallagher, American mentor of a 2008 Intel Science Talent Search (ISTS) finalist ‡ || 
|-id=245
| 24245 Ezratty ||  || Marla Ezratty, American mentor of a 2008 Intel Science Talent Search (ISTS) finalist ‡ || 
|-id=249
| 24249 Bobbiolson ||  || Roberta Rae ("Bobbi") Olson, née Russell, American wife of the University of Arizona basketball coach Lute Olson, and fund-raiser for the Arizona Arthritis Center and the Arizona Cancer Center || 
|-id=250
| 24250 Luteolson ||  || Robert Luther ("Lute") Olson, American collegiate Hall of Fame head basketball coach of the University of Arizona || 
|-id=259
| 24259 Chriswalker ||  || Christopher W. Walker, American astronomer, who helped create the Global Network of Astronomical Telescopes photometric data reduction pipeline || 
|-id=260
| 24260 Kriváň ||  || Kriváň, a symbolic mountain in the High Tatras, Slovakia † || 
|-id=261
| 24261 Judilegault ||  || Judith Legault, American mentor of a 2008 Intel Science Talent Search (ISTS) finalist ‡ || 
|-id=265
| 24265 Banthonytwarog ||  || Barbara J. Anthony-Twarog, American astronomer || 
|-id=268
| 24268 Charconley ||  || Charles Conley, American mentor of a 2008 Intel Science Talent Search (ISTS) finalist ‡ || 
|-id=269
| 24269 Kittappa ||  || Vasantha Kittappa, American mentor of a 2008 Intel Science Talent Search (ISTS) finalist ‡ || 
|-id=270
| 24270 Dougskinner ||  || Doug Skinner, American mentor of a 2008 Intel Science Talent Search (ISTS) finalist ‡ || 
|-id=274
| 24274 Alliswheeler ||  || Allison Wheeler, American mentor of a 2008 Intel Science Talent Search (ISTS) finalist ‡ || 
|-id=277
| 24277 Schoch ||  || Jane Schoch, American mentor of a 2008 Intel Science Talent Search (ISTS) finalist ‡ || 
|-id=278
| 24278 Davidgreen ||  || David Green, American mentor of a 2008 Intel Science Talent Search (ISTS) finalist ‡ || 
|-id=280
| 24280 Rohenderson ||  || Robin Henderson, American mentor of a 2008 Intel Science Talent Search (ISTS) finalist ‡ || 
|-id=289
| 24289 Anthonypalma ||  || Anthony Palma, American mentor of a 2008 Intel Science Talent Search (ISTS) finalist ‡ || 
|-id=292
| 24292 Susanragan ||  || Susan Ragan, American mentor of a 2008 Intel Science Talent Search (ISTS) finalist ‡ || 
|-id=296
| 24296 Marychristie ||  || Mary Christie, American mentor of a 2008 Intel Science Talent Search (ISTS) finalist ‡ || 
|-id=297
| 24297 Jonbach ||  || Jon Bach, American mentor of a 2008 Intel Science Talent Search (ISTS) finalist  ‡ || 
|}

24301–24400 

|-
| 24301 Gural ||  || Peter S. Gural (born 1955), a scientist who has applied advanced image processing techniques to both asteroid and meteor detection in ground and space-based systems.  || 
|-id=303
| 24303 Michaelrice || 1999 YY || Michael (Mike) L. Rice, American amateur astronomer, co-founder of the New Mexico Skies Observatory near Cloudcroft with his wife Lynn || 
|-id=304
| 24304 Lynnrice || 1999 YZ || Eileen Lynn Rice, American amateur astronomer, co-founder of the New Mexico Skies Observatory near Cloudcroft with her husband Michael || 
|-id=305
| 24305 Darrellparnell ||  || Darrell Parnell, American astronomer || 
|-id=308
| 24308 Cowenco ||  || Courtney, Wendy and Cody, offspring of the first discoverer || 
|-id=316
| 24316 Anncooper ||  || Ann Simone Cooper, American 2008 Intel International Science and Engineering Fair (ISEF) winner, for her animal sciences project. || 
|-id=317
| 24317 Pukarhamal ||  || Pukar Hamal, American 2008 Intel International Science and Engineering Fair (ISEF) winner, for his animal sciences project. || 
|-id=318
| 24318 Vivianlee ||  || Vivian Alice Lee, American 2008 Intel International Science and Engineering Fair, for her behavioral and social sciences project. (ISEF) winner || 
|-id=325
| 24325 Kaleighanne ||  || Kaleigh Anne Eichel, American 2008 Intel International Science and Engineering Fair (ISEF) winner for her behavioral and social sciences project and Seaborg Stockholm International Youth Science Seminar (SIYSS) selectee || 
|-id=328
| 24328 Thomasburr ||  || Thomas McLean Burr, American 2008 Intel International Science and Engineering Fair (ISEF) winner, for his behavioral and social sciences project. || 
|-id=331
| 24331 Alyshaowen ||  || Alysha Harper Owen, American 2008 Intel International Science and Engineering Fair (ISEF) winner, for her behavioral and social sciences project. || 
|-id=332
| 24332 Shaunalinn ||  || Shauna Theresa Linn, American 2008 Intel International Science and Engineering Fair (ISEF) winner, for her behavioral and social sciences project. || 
|-id=333
| 24333 Petermassey ||  || Peter Hans Massey, American 2008 Intel International Science and Engineering Fair (ISEF) winner,  for his behavioral and social sciences team project. || 
|-id=334
| 24334 Conard ||  || Russell B. Conard, American 2008 Intel International Science and Engineering Fair (ISEF) winner, for his biochemistry project. || 
|-id=337
| 24337 Johannessen ||  || Liv Helena Johannessen, American 2008 Intel International Science and Engineering Fair (ISEF) winner, for her biochemistry project. || 
|-id=344
| 24344 Brianbarnett ||  || Brian Gray Barnett, American 2008 Intel International Science and Engineering Fair (ISEF) winner, for his biochemistry team project. || 
|-id=345
| 24345 Llaverias ||  || Priscila Elena Llaverias, American 2008 Intel International Science and Engineering Fair (ISEF) winner, for her biochemistry team project. || 
|-id=346
| 24346 Lehienphan ||  || Le Hien Thi Phan, American 2008 Intel International Science and Engineering Fair (ISEF) winner, for her biochemistry team project. || 
|-id=347
| 24347 Arthurkuan ||  || Arthur Kuan, American 2008 Intel International Science and Engineering Fair (ISEF) winner, for his cellular and molecular biology project. || 
|-id=351
| 24351 Fionawood ||  || Fiona Winifred Wood, American 2008 Intel International Science and Engineering Fair (ISEF) winner, for her cellular and molecular biology project. || 
|-id=352
| 24352 Kapilrama ||  || Kapil Vishveshwar Ramachandran, American 2008 Intel International Science and Engineering Fair (ISEF) winner, for his cellular and molecular biology project. || 
|-id=353
| 24353 Patrickhsu ||  || Patrick David Hsu, American 2008 Intel International Science and Engineering Fair (ISEF) winner, for his cellular and molecular biology project. || 
|-id=354
| 24354 Caz ||  || Christopher Allen Zimmerman, American 2008 Intel International Science and Engineering Fair (ISEF) winner, for his chemistry project. || 
|-id=369
| 24369 Evanichols ||  || Eva Megan Nichols, American 2008 Intel International Science and Engineering Fair (ISEF) winner, for her chemistry team project. || 
|-id=370
| 24370 Marywang ||  || Mary Xue Wang, American 2008 Intel International Science and Engineering Fair (ISEF) winner, for her chemistry team project. || 
|-id=372
| 24372 Timobauman ||  || Timothy Bauman, American 2008 Intel International Science and Engineering Fair (ISEF) winner, for his computer science project. || 
|-id=376
| 24376 Ramesh ||  || Vinayak Ramesh, American 2008 Intel International Science and Engineering Fair (ISEF) winner, for his computer science project. || 
|-id=378
| 24378 Katelyngibbs ||  || Katelyn Elizabeth Gibbs, American 2008 Intel International Science and Engineering Fair (ISEF) winner, for her earth and planetary science project. || 
|-id=380
| 24380 Dorippe ||  || Dorippe was ransomed by Anius from pirates who had kidnapped her. Dorippe had three daughters with Anius ̶ Elais, Oeno, and Spermo. || 
|-id=385
| 24385 Katcagen ||  || Katherine Thompson Cagen, American 2008 Intel International Science and Engineering Fair (ISEF) winner, for her earth and planetary science project. || 
|-id=386
| 24386 McLindon ||  || Bonnie Joyce McLindon, American 2008 Intel International Science and Engineering Fair (ISEF) winner, for her earth and planetary science project. || 
|-id=387
| 24387 Trettel ||  || Stephen Jerome Trettel, American 2008 Intel International Science and Engineering Fair (ISEF) winner, for his electrical and mechanical engineering project. || 
|-id=397
| 24397 Parkerowan ||  || Parker Owan, American 2008 Intel International Science and Engineering Fair (ISEF) winner, for his electrical and mechanical engineering project. || 
|}

24401–24500 

|-id=409
| 24409 Caninquinn ||  || Canin Quinn Christell, American 2008 Intel International Science and Engineering Fair (ISEF) winner, for his electrical and mechanical engineering project. || 
|-id=410
| 24410 Juliewalker ||  || Julie Emily Walker, American 2008 Intel International Science and Engineering Fair (ISEF) winner, for her electrical and mechanical engineering project. || 
|-id=411
| 24411 Janches ||  || Diego Janches (born 1967), a space weather scientist at the Goddard Space Flight Center. || 
|-id=412
| 24412 Ericpalmer ||  || Eric E. Palmer (born 1968), a research scientist at the Planetary Science Institute in Tucson. || 
|-id=413
| 24413 Britneyschmidt ||  || Britney Elyce Schmidt (born 1982), an assistant professor in the department of Earth and Atmospheric Sciences at Georgia Tech. || 
|-id=420
| 24420 Thasos ||  || Thasos was one of three sons of Anius. He was devoured by a pack of dogs on his home island of Delos. || 
|-id=421
| 24421 Djorgovski ||  || Stanislav George Djorgovski (born 1956) is a Professor of Astronomy at the California Institute of Technology. He has performed fundamental research in many topics, including high-z galaxies, globular clusters, quasars and galactic evolution. He has pioneered the use of advanced computing techniques for astronomical problems || 
|-id=422
| 24422 Helentressa ||  || Helen Tressa D´Couto, American 2008 Intel International Science and Engineering Fair (ISEF) winner, for her environmental management project. || 
|-id=426
| 24426 Belova ||  || Elena Belova (born 1947) is a retired fencer from Belarus who became the first woman to win four gold medals during five Olympics from 1968 through 1980. In 2007 she was awarded the Pierre de Coubertin medal by the International Olympic Committee. || 
|-id=432
| 24432 Elizamcnitt ||  || Eliza Helen McNitt, American 2008 Intel International Science and Engineering Fair (ISEF) winner, for her environmental management project. || 
|-id=434
| 24434 Josephhoscheidt ||  || Joseph Hoscheidt, a member of the Mountain Operations team for Steward Observatory at the University of Arizona. || 
|-id=438
| 24438 Michaeloy ||  || Michael Jeffrey Loy, American 2008 Intel International Science and Engineering Fair (ISEF) winner, for his materials and bioengineering project. || 
|-id=439
| 24439 Yanney ||  || Michael (born 1933) and Gail (born 1936) Yanney, American philanthropists and community leaders, based in Omaha, Nebraska. || 
|-id=441
| 24441 Jopek ||  || Tadeusz J. Jopek (born 1951), a professor at Adam Mickiewicz University, Poznaņ, Poland.  || 
|-id=450
| 24450 Victorchang ||  || Victor Peter Chang, Chinese-Australian heart surgeon || 
|-id=455
| 24455 Kaňuchová ||  || Zuzana Kanuchová (born 1979), a researcher at the Astronomical Institute of the Slovak Academy of Sciences. || 
|-id=464
| 24464 Williamkalb ||  || William B. Kalb, American 2008 Intel International Science and Engineering Fair (ISEF) winner, for his materials and bioengineering project. || 
|-id=474
| 24474 Ananthram ||  || Ananth Ram, American 2008 Intel International Science and Engineering Fair (ISEF) winner, for his materials and bioengineering project. || 
|-id=480
| 24480 Glavin ||  || Daniel P. Glavin (born 1974), an astrobiologist at the Goddard Space Flight Center. || 
|-id=484
| 24484 Chester ||  || Shai Matthew Chester, American 2008 Intel International Science and Engineering Fair (ISEF) winner, for his materials and bioengineering team project. || 
|-id=488
| 24488 Eliebochner ||  || Elie Joshua Bochner, American 2008 Intel International Science and Engineering Fair (ISEF) winner, for his materials and bioengineering team project. || 
|-id=492
| 24492 Nathanmonroe ||  || Nathan McKay Monroe, American 2008 Intel International Science and Engineering Fair (ISEF) winner, for his energy and transportation project. || 
|-id=493
| 24493 McCommon ||  || Steven Richard McCommon, American 2008 Intel International Science and Engineering Fair (ISEF) winner, for his environmental sciences project. || 
|-id=494
| 24494 Megmoulding ||  || Megan Moulding, American 2008 Intel International Science and Engineering Fair (ISEF) winner, for her environmental sciences project. || 
|-id=495
| 24495 Degroff ||  || Bill DeGroff (born 1956), Telescope Facilities Manager at Lowell Observatory, was instrumental in realizing the exceptional performance of the Lowell Discovery Telescope (LDT). Prior to his present operational position, he served as Project Manager, and before that Project Engineer during LDT development. || 
|}

24501–24600 

|-id=503
| 24503 Kero ||  || Johan Kero (born 1978), a scientist at the Swedish Institute of Space Physics || 
|-id=509
| 24509 Joycechai ||  || Joyce Sophia Chai, a 2008 Intel International Science and Engineering Fair (ISEF) winner for her environmental sciences project. || 
|-id=517
| 24517 Omattage ||  || Natalie Saranga Omattage, a 2008 Intel International Science and Engineering Fair (ISEF) winner for her environmental sciences project and recipient of an Intel Foundation Young Scientist Award || 
|-id=520
| 24520 Abramson ||  || Ronit Batya Roth Abramson, American 2008 Intel International Science and Engineering Fair (ISEF) winner, for her environmental sciences project. || 
|-id=523
| 24523 Sanaraoof ||  || Sana Raoof, American 2008 Intel International Science and Engineering Fair (ISEF) winner for her mathematical sciences project and recipient of an Intel Foundation Young Scientist Award || 
|-id=524
| 24524 Kevinhawkins ||  || Kevin Kyle Hawkins, American 2008 Intel International Science and Engineering Fair (ISEF) winner for his mathematical sciences project. || 
|-id=526
| 24526 Desai ||  || Kshitij A. Desai, American 2008 Intel International Science and Engineering Fair (ISEF) winner for his medicine and health sciences project. || 
|-id=529
| 24529 Urbach ||  || Jourdan Brandt Urbach, American 2008 Intel International Science and Engineering Fair (ISEF) winner for his medicine and health sciences project. || 
|-id=532
| 24532 Csabakiss ||  || Csaba Kiss (born 1973), an astronomer at the Konkoly Observatory, Budapest, Hungary. || 
|-id=533
| 24533 Kokhirova ||  || Gulchekhra I. Kokhirova (born 1962), a scientist at the Institute of Astrophysics of the Academy of Sciences of the Republic of Tajikistan. || 
|-id=535
| 24535 Neslušan ||  || Lubos Neslušan (born 1960), a meteor astronomer at the Astronomical Institute of the Slovak Academy of Sciences. || 
|-id=538
| 24538 Charliexie ||  || Charlie L. Xie, American 2008 Intel International Science and Engineering Fair (ISEF) winner for his medicine and health sciences project. || 
|-id=541
| 24541 Hangzou ||  || Hang Richard Zou, American 2008 Intel International Science and Engineering Fair (ISEF) winner for his medicine and health sciences project. || 
|-id=546
| 24546 Darnell ||  || Alicia Marie Darnell, American 2008 Intel International Science and Engineering Fair (ISEF) winner for her medicine and health sciences project. || 
|-id=547
| 24547 Stauber ||  || Zachary Jason Stauber, American 2008 Intel International Science and Engineering Fair (ISEF) winner for his medicine and health sciences project. || 
|-id=548
| 24548 Katieeverett ||  || Katie Elizabeth Everett, American 2008 Intel International Science and Engineering Fair (ISEF) winner for her medicine and health sciences project. || 
|-id=549
| 24549 Jaredgoodman ||  || Jared Vega Goodman, American 2008 Intel International Science and Engineering Fair (ISEF) winner for his medicine and health sciences team project and recipient of a European Union Contest for Young Scientists Award || 
|-id=587
| 24587 Kapaneus || 4613 T-2 || Capaneus, in Greek mythology, son of Hipponous and father of Sthenelus, and one of the Seven against Thebes || 
|}

24601–24700 

|-
| 24601 Valjean || 1971 UW || When Jean Valjean, the central character in Victor Hugo's Les Misérables, was in prison, he was known by the number 24601. By associating this minor planet with Valjean's name, a connection is established with one of the world's greatest works of literature || 
|-id=602
| 24602 Mozzhorin || 1972 TE || Yurij Aleksandrovich Mozzhorin (1920–1998) was one of the organizers and leaders in the field of Soviet space-rocket engineering. He was the founder of the Space Mission Control Center and the director of the Central Research Institute of Machine Building (1961–1990) || 
|-id=603
| 24603 Mekistheus || 1973 SQ || Mecisteus, Greek mythological character, son of Talaus and father of Euryalus, and according to some accounts one of the Seven against Thebes || 
|-id=604
| 24604 Vasilermakov ||  || Ermakov Vasilij Timofeevich (1927–2007) was a priest, a historian of Christianity and a social activist. || 
|-id=605
| 24605 Tsykalyuk ||  || Sergej Alekseevich Tsykalyuk, Russian economist || 
|-id=607
| 24607 Sevnatu ||  || Sevastopol National Technical University, Ukraine || 
|-id=608
| 24608 Alexveselkov || 1977 SL || Alexej Nikonovich Veselkov, Russian molecular physicist and biophysicist || 
|-id=609
| 24609 Evgenij ||  || Evgenij Borisovich Aleksandrov, Russian physicist || 
|-id=611
| 24611 Svetochka ||  || Svetlana Anatolʹevna Biryukova (born 1967), oldest daughter of the discoverer, graduated from Nizhnij Novgorod University with mathematics and law degrees. She is now a lawyer and is raising two children || 
|-id=626
| 24626 Astrowizard ||  || David V. ("Dave") Rodrigues, American astronomy teacher || 
|-id=637
| 24637 Olʹgusha ||  || Olʹga Anatolʹevna Sazonova (born 1975), youngest daughter of the discoverer, graduated from Simferopol University with a mathematics degree. She lives in New York and is raising three children || 
|-id=639
| 24639 Mukhametdinov ||  || Vladimir Nagimovich Mukhametdinov (born 1946) worked for 46 years as a mechanical and power engineer, then as a teacher in the Technical Lyceum. As an enthusiastic amateur astronomer, he provides tireless assistance in upgrading the electronics of the telescopes at CrAO || 
|-id=640
| 24640 Omiwa ||  || The Ōmiwa Shrine is one of the oldest Shinto shrines in Japan. It is located on Miwa-Yama, a mountain located in the southeast of the Yamato Basin, Miwa, Sakurai City, Nara prefecture. || 
|-id=641
| 24641 Enver ||  || Enver Elimdarovich Abduraimov, Ukrainian (Crimean) physician || 
|-id=643
| 24643 MacCready || 1984 SS || Paul MacCready, American engineer, who won the Kremer prize for the first human-powered flying machine || 
|-id=645
| 24645 Šegon || 1985 PF || Damir Šegon (born 1962) has been a dedicated amateur meteor astronomer and mentor for more than three decades. He serves as Secretary of the Astronomical Society "Istra" Pula, Croatia and coordinates the Croatian Meteor Network's database of meteoroid orbital elements. || 
|-id=646
| 24646 Stober || 1985 PG || Gunter Stober (born 1979), an expert in radar measurements of meteors and the atmosphere at the Leibniz-Institute of Atmospheric Physics in Kühlungsborn, Germany. || 
|-id=647
From 1954 to 1983 he delivered more than 8000 lectures. For 21 years he taught astronavigation to the cosmonauts. He is the author of hundreds of publications || 
|-id=648
| 24648 Evpatoria ||  || Evpatoria, Crimea, Ukraine, on the occasion of its 2500th anniversary in 2003 || 
|-id=649
| 24649 Balaklava ||  || Balaklava, Crimea, Ukraine, now part of Sebastopol || 
|-id=654
| 24654 Fossett || 1987 KL || Steve Fossett, American millionaire and adventurer || 
|-id=658
| 24658 Misch || 1987 UX || Anthony Misch (born 1951) has made significant contributions to the history of astronomy through his creation and direction of the Lick Observatory Historical Collections. His career in astronomy spans over 30 years from the Mt. Wilson to Lick observatories. || 
|-id=662
| 24662 Gryll || 1988 GS || Matyáš Gryll of Gryllov, Czech astronomer † || 
|-id=663
| 24663 Philae ||  || Philae, an island (now submerged) in Lake Nasser, Egypt. || 
|-id=665
| 24665 Tolerantia ||  || Latin for "tolerance", meaning nowadays tolerating different ideological and religious opinions and behaviours || 
|-id=666
| 24666 Miesvanrohe ||  || Ludwig Mies van der Rohe, German-American architect and designer || 
|-id=671
| 24671 Frankmartin ||  || Frank Martin, Swiss composer || 
|-id=679
| 24679 Van Rensbergen ||  || Walter van Rensbergen (born 1941), a physicist at the VUB-University in Brussels. || 
|-id=680
| 24680 Alleven ||  || "All [of the] even" digits || 
|-id=681
| 24681 Granados ||  || Enrique Granados (1867–1916). a Spanish pianist and a composer of classical music in a uniquely Spanish style. || 
|-id=695
| 24695 Štyrský ||  || Jindřich Štyrský (1899–1942) was a Czech Surrealist painter, graphic artist, photographer, poet and editor. The painter Toyen was his artistic partner. They became members of Devetsil and together with Nezval, Teige and Brouk founded The Group of Surrealists in Czechoslovakia in 1934 || 
|-id=697
| 24697 Rastrelli ||  || Carlo Bartolomeo Rastrelli and Francesco Bartolomeo Rastrelli, father and son, Italian sculptor and architect, respectively || 
|-id=699
| 24699 Schwekendiek ||  || Peter Schwekendiek, German astrophysicist || 
|}

24701–24800 

|-
| 24701 Elyu-Ene ||  || Elyu-Ene, "Large River", the Evenk name for the Lena River, one of the longest in the world (4400 km), flowing from the Baikal Mountains to the Laptev sea || 
|-id=709
| 24709 Mitau ||  || Ancient name of the Latvian city of Jelgava || 
|-id=711
| 24711 Chamisso ||  || Adelbert von Chamisso, German-French poet and botanist || 
|-id=712
| 24712 Boltzmann ||  || Ludwig Boltzmann, Austrian physicist || 
|-id=713
| 24713 Ekrutt ||  || Joachim Ekrutt, German lawyer, tax consultant, and amateur astronomer || 
|-id=728
| 24728 Scagell ||  || Robin Scagell, British author, consultant and broadcaster on astronomy || 
|-id=732
| 24732 Leonardcohen ||  || Leonard Cohen (1934–2016) was a Canadian singer, songwriter, poet and novelist. His song "Suzanne" was one of many that became a hit. He was honored with one of the Prince of Asturias awards. Name suggested by K. Leterme. || 
|-id=734
| 24734 Kareness ||  || Karen Penelope Steel ("Karen Ess"), British geneticist and elder sister of the discoverer || 
|-id=748
| 24748 Nernst ||  || Walther Hermann Nernst, German chemist || 
|-id=749
| 24749 Grebel ||  || Eva K. Grebel, German astronomer || 
|-id=750
| 24750 Ohm ||  || Georg Simon Ohm, German physicist || 
|-id=751
| 24751 Kroemer ||  || Herbert Kroemer, German-American physicist and Nobelist || 
|-id=754
| 24754 Zellyfry ||  || The traditional food Zellyfry is made from potatoes and okra. Zellyfry is similar to Japanese Korokke but has no butter. Its name comes from the fact that it looks like zeni, old Japanese money. Its roots come from the Japanese-Russian war and the Chinese vegetable manju || 
|-id=761
| 24761 Ahau ||  || Kinich Ahau (Ahau-Kin, "Lord of the Sun-face"), Mayan Sun-god || 
|-id=778
| 24778 Nemsu ||  || New Mexico State University † ‡ || 
|-id=779
| 24779 Presque Isle ||  || University of Maine at Presque Isle, Presque Isle, Maine, location of a 65-km long scale model of the solar system, on the occasion of its centennial in 2003 || 
|-id=794
| 24794 Kurland ||  || Kurland or Courland, the ancient (13th–18th centuries) name of the districts Zemgale and Kurzeme of present-day Latvia || 
|}

24801–24900 

|-id=818
| 24818 Menichelli || 1994 WX || Marco Menichelli (born 1942), an Italian amateur astronomer, software developer for transient objects, and member of the astronomer team at Pistoia Mountains Astronomical Observatory. He lives in Fiesole, near Florence. || 
|-id=826
| 24826 Pascoli ||  || Giovanni Pascoli (1855–1912), an Italian poet and classical scholar || 
|-id=827
| 24827 Maryphil || 1995 RA || Mary Clark (born 1938) and Phil Spahr (born 1938) are the parents of the discoverer. || 
|-id=829
| 24829 Berounurbi ||  || The Czech town of Beroun. The royal town was founded in the year 1265, at a strategic position southwest of Prague near the Berounka river. Now an important industrial, transportation and tourist center, the town has a rich history as evidenced by a well-preserved downtown urban zone || 
|-id=837
| 24837 Mšecké Žehrovice ||  || The Czech village of Mšecké Žehrovice in central Bohemia is known for its remnants of an ancient Celtic sanctuary. || 
|-id=838
| 24838 Abilunon ||  || Abilunon is the presumed name of an ancient Celtic town, founded in the 1st century BC on a strategic peninsula of the Vltava river, the Czech Republic. || 
|-id=847
| 24847 Polesný ||  || Bohumil Polesný (1905–1976) was a Czech astronomer and astronomy popularizer who started the construction of the Kleť Observatory and served as director of the preceding (České Budějovice) observatory during the 1950s and 1960s. || 
|-id=856
| 24856 Messidoro ||  || Piero Messidoro (born 1950) is an Italian space engineer who has developed projects and technologies in human and robotic space exploration, notably the International Space Station, new generation transportation systems and moon and Mars missions. He gives international lectures on space exploration system engineering || 
|-id=857
| 24857 Sperello ||  || Sperello di Serego Alighieri (born 1952) is an Italian astrophysicist who made major contributions to the field of extragalactic astronomy. He is a descendant of Dante Alighieri. || 
|-id=858
| 24858 Diethelm ||  || Roger Diethelm (born 1948), a Swiss astronomer and observer of variable stars, who founded the R. Szafraniec Observatory / in Metzerlen, Switzerland, where Marek Wolf, who discovered this minor planet, previously observed. Diethelm is also the editor of the variable-stars bulletin of the Swiss Astronomical Society. || 
|-id=862
| 24862 Hromec ||  || Arnost Hromec (1924–2013), was a Slovak specialist in internal medicine, recipient of the prize and medal of the Slovak Medical Association and of the Reiman medal. || 
|-id=863
| 24863 Cheli || 1996 EB || Maurizio Cheli (born 1959), an Italian air force officer and ESA astronaut, who flew with NASA's STS-75 Space Shuttle mission in 1996. || 
|-id=889
| 24889 Tamurahosinomura ||  || "Tamurahosinomura" ("the star village") opened in 1992 near the Abukumado limestone cave in Fukushima prefecture. The 0.65-m reflector at Hoshinomura Observatory was rendered unrepairable by the Great Eastern Japan Earthquake in March 2011, but was reborn as the "KIZUNA Telescope" in July 2012. || 
|-id=890
| 24890 Amaliafinzi ||  || Amalia Ercoli Finzi (born 1937), a professor of Aerospace Mechanics and an Honorary Professor at Politecnico di Milano, is a researcher and an educator in Spaceflight Dynamics and Space Mission Design. She was the P.I. of the SD2 instrument, on board of the Philae lander on Rosetta, to drill and sample comet 67P. || 
|-id=898
| 24898 Alanholmes ||  || Alan W. Holmes (born 1950), an American optical engineer and amateur gamma-ray burst astronomer, who helped spark the CCD astronomical revolution. He is a member of the Santa Barbara Astronomical Group. || 
|-id=899
| 24899 Dominiona ||  || Canada, officially the "Dominion of Canada" under the Constitution Acts of 1867 and 1982. || 
|}

24901–25000 

|-id=907
| 24907 Alfredhaar ||  || Alfréd Haar, Hungarian mathematician || 
|-id=910
| 24910 Haruoando ||  || Haruo Ando (born 1951), a doctor of internal medicine, is a Japanese amateur astronomer and a member of the Yamagata Astronomical Club || 
|-id=911
| 24911 Kojimashigemi || 1997 DU || Shigemi Kojima (born 1931) built a private observatory in 1974, with a 0.25-m reflector in a dome he opens wholeheartedly to local children and citizens. He is also now an adviser to the Astronomical Society of Shikoku || 
|-id=916
| 24916 Stelzhamer ||  || Franz Stelzhamer (1802–1874) was an Austrian poet and novelist who wrote the words to the Austrian national anthem and whose "s'Hoamatgsang" is the anthem of the Upper Austria province. || 
|-id=918
| 24918 Tedkooser ||  || Ted Kooser, American poet, Poet Laureate of the United States in 2004 || 
|-id=919
| 24919 Teruyoshi ||  || Teruyoshi Ibi (born 1956), is a science teacher at a junior high school in Kitakyushu. He is also a well-known amateur astronomer and acted as a branch director of the Fukuoka Astronomical Society || 
|-id=922
| 24922 Bechtel ||  || Marian Joan Bechtel (born 1994), a finalist in the 2012 Intel Science Talent Search, a science competition for high-school seniors, for her engineering project. || 
|-id=923
| 24923 Claralouisa ||  || Clara Louisa Fannjiang (born 1994), a finalist in the 2012 Intel Science Talent Search for her engineering project and was also awarded second place in the 2011 Intel International Science and Engineering Fair. || 
|-id=926
| 24926 Jinpan ||  || Jin Pan (born 1994), a finalist in the 2012 Intel Science Talent Search, a science competition for high-school seniors, for his bioinformatics and genomics project. || 
|-id=927
| 24927 Brianpalmer ||  || Brian Palmer, mentor of a finalist in the 2012 Intel Science Talent Search, a science competition for high-school seniors. || 
|-id=928
| 24928 Susanbehel ||  || Susan Behel, mentor of a finalist in the 2012 Intel Science Talent Search, a science competition for high-school seniors. || 
|-id=930
| 24930 Annajamison ||  || Anna Jamison, mentor of a finalist in the 2012 Intel Science Talent Search, a science competition for high-school seniors. || 
|-id=931
| 24931 Noeth ||  || William Noeth, mentor of a finalist in the 2012 Intel Science Talent Search, a science competition for high-school seniors. || 
|-id=934
| 24934 Natecovert ||  || Nathaniel Covert, mentor of a finalist in the 2012 Intel Science Talent Search, a science competition for high-school seniors. || 
|-id=935
| 24935 Godfreyhardy ||  || Godfrey Harold Hardy, British mathematician || 
|-id=939
| 24939 Chiminello || 1997 JR || Vincenzo Chiminello  (1741–1815), nephew of Giuseppe Toaldo, was an Italian astronomer and translator || 
|-id=940
| 24940 Sankichiyama ||  || Sankichiyama mountain is located to the east of Kaminoyama, a hot-spring town in Yamagata prefecture. The mountain is loved by citizens as a hiking course || 
|-id=944
| 24944 Harish-Chandra ||  || Harish-Chandra, Indian-American mathematician || 
|-id=945
| 24945 Houziaux ||  || Léo Houziaux (born 1932), a Belgian astrophysicist at University of Liège, specialized in stellar structure at Mt. Wilson and Palomar. || 
|-id=946
| 24946 Foscolo || 1997 NQ || Ugo Foscolo (1778–1827), leader of exponent of Neoclassic and Pre-Romanticism Italian literature || 
|-id=947
| 24947 Hausdorff ||  || Felix Hausdorff, German mathematician || 
|-id=948
| 24948 Babote ||  || Babote tower, the former Babote Observatory, Montpellier, France, now the meeting place of the members of the Société Astronomique de Montpellier || 
|-id=949
| 24949 Klačka ||  || Slovak physicist Jozef Klačka (born 1963) is an associate professor at Comenius University, Bratislava. His theoretical research centers on the orbital evolution of dust particles, taking into account various effects (e.g., particle shape, solar wind, Yarkovsky effect) || 
|-id=950
| 24950 Nikhilas || 1997 QF || Nikhilas Jonathan Marsden  (born 1995) is the first grandson of Brian G. Marsden, a director of the Minor Planet Center. || 
|-id=956
| 24956 Qiannan ||  || Qiannan Buyi and Miao Autonomous Prefecture (Qiannan), with a population of 4.2 million from 43 ethnic groups, is an autonomous prefecture of Guizhou Province, P.R. China. || 
|-id=959
| 24959 Zielenbach || 1997 TR || Bill Zielenbach (born 1943), a former rocket scientist. || 
|-id=962
| 24962 Kenjitoba ||  || Kenji Toba (born 1950), Japanese amateur astronomer, discoverer of comet C/1971 E1, and director of the BiStar Observatory (see ) since its foundation || 
|-id=965
| 24965 Akayu ||  || The Japanese town of Akayu is situated in the southern part of Nanyo city in the Yamagata Prefecture. || 
|-id=967
| 24967 Frištenský ||  || Gustav Frištenský, Czech wrestler. || 
|-id=968
| 24968 Chernyakhovsky ||  || Alexander Chernyakhovsky, American 2008 Intel International Science and Engineering Fair (ISEF) winner || 
|-id=969
| 24969 Lucafini ||  || Luca Fini (born 1952) is an astronomer, software developer and system manager at the Arcetri Observatory in Florence, Italy. || 
|-id=974
| 24974 Macúch ||  || Rudolf Macúch, 20th-century Slovak orientalist and humanist || 
|-id=976
| 24976 Jurajtoth ||  || Juraj Toth (born 1975), a researcher at the Comenius University in Bratislava. || 
|-id=977
| 24977 Tongzhan ||  || Tong Zhan, American 2008 Intel International Science and Engineering Fair (ISEF) winner || 
|-id=981
| 24981 Shigekimurakami ||  || Shigeki Murakami (born 1962), a Japanese amateur astronomer from Shiga Prefecture and co-discoverer of comet C/2002 E2 and 332P/Ikeya–Murakami. He is a senior researcher at the Forestry and Forest Products Research Institute. His discoveries he made with a homemade 0.46-meter Dobsonian telescope. || 
|-id=984
| 24984 Usui ||  || Fumihiko Usui (born 1974), a research associate at the University of Tokyo. || 
|-id=985
| 24985 Benuri ||  || Benjamin Uri Hoffman, American 2008 Intel International Science and Engineering Fair (ISEF) winner || 
|-id=986
| 24986 Yalefan ||  || Yale Wang Fan, American 2008 Intel International Science and Engineering Fair (ISEF) winner || 
|-id=988
| 24988 Alainmilsztajn ||  || Alain Milsztajn (1955–2007) was a French particle physicist and astronomer || 
|-id=994
| 24994 Prettyman ||  || Thomas H. Prettyman (born 1964), a senior scientist with the Planetary Science Institute. || 
|-id=997
| 24997 Petergabriel ||  || Peter Gabriel (born 1950), English rock musician, cofounder of the Genesis progressive rock group || 
|-id=998
| 24998 Hermite ||  || Charles Hermite (1822–1901), French mathematician || 
|-id=999
| 24999 Hieronymus ||  || Hieronymus Bosch (c. 1450–1516), Dutch painter † || 
|-id=000
| 25000 Astrometria ||  || Latin for Astrometry || 
|}

References 

024001-025000